2008 was the Canberra Raiders' 27th season in the National Rugby League competition. The Raiders began the year favourites to win the wooden spoon. However, they finished 6th (out of 16) and were eliminated in the first week of the finals.

Season summary
The 2008 season started with some promise for the Raiders – a good showing despite a loss in round 1 vs. Newcastle was followed up with two solid wins against Penrith and St. George-Illawarra. The club has since suffered a series of losses, whilst snaring only the occasional victory, with a big come from behind victory against Wests being noteworthy. In the representative field, Todd Carney and Joel Monaghan picked for Country Origin, and Monaghan being a shadow player for the New South Wales Side.
However, as in recent seasons, injuries have been the curse of the Canberra club, with no less than three players suffering dreaded ACL ruptures, arguably the worst kind of injury a footballer can receive, essentially ending their season. Worse, the three players afflicted, Will Zillman, Lincoln Withers and Phil Graham are amongst the Raiders best players. Compounding this, talented back-rowers Neville Costigan and Tom Learoyd-Lahrs have spent minimal time on the field due to recurring minor injuries. The club has also suffered badly in the recruiting race, with Zillman and strong front rower Michael Weyman opting to go elsewhere next season, with indications that Costigan and Scott Logan will do the same. Additionally, half Michael Dobson left the club mid-season for the English club Hull KR, due to lack of opportunities in Canberra. Finally, Coach Neil Henry has exercised a get-out clause in his contract, and will coach the North-Queensland Cowboys in 2009, with former player and club legend, but inexperienced coach, David Furner taking over in 2009. To date, beyond a few talented youngsters, the club is yet to procure a single player of note for season 2009, and will once again be forced to rely on youthful talent. At Round 13, Canberra sat well outside the eight, and the season looked as though it could end with a whimper.

However, far from fading away, the Raiders bounced back with a comprehensive victory over the Brisbane Broncos and then proceeded to thrash the Canterbury Bulldogs, inflicting the worst loss on the Sydney-based club in over half a century. Despite successive losses to the Cronulla Sharks and defending premiers Melbourne Storm, Canberra fought hard in both games, then broke a 13-year losing streak in Wollongong (and ended a 7 match winning streak by the home team) with an impressive win over St. George-Illawarra. The season highlight, however, was a comprehensive 34–12 win over league leaders, the Sydney Roosters. With 7 rounds left in the 2008 premiership, Canberra sits just one point outside the top eight. With a comparatively friendly draw, playing several teams below them on the table, the Raiders are poised to sneak into the semi-finals for the first time in two years. After a comprehensive 74–12 win over the Panthers the Raiders moved into an unexpected 6th spot on the ladder from 11th to almost cement a spot in the 2008 finals series with 4 games remaining.

The Raiders went closer to the top eight with two important wins against Newcastle and Souths. They are now on a three-match winning streak with 2 games remaining.

The season has not been without controversy, however, with star halfback Todd Carney and fullback Bronx Goodwin being stood down by the club after an altercation at a Canberra nightclub following the round 19 win against the Roosters. Carney was eventually dismissed by the club after failing to agree to the punishment plan the club had laid out for him, Goodwin's future is still to be determined.

As of 6 September 2008, despite a heavy injury toll, the Raiders are guaranteed a place in the NRL 2008 Finals Series, a feat which was at the start of the season impossible according to Rugby League punditry in Australia.

The Raiders semi-final appearance was brief, however. After being defeated by the Cronulla Sharks, the Raiders 6th-place finish was considered to be enough to get them a second chance. However, a huge upset with 8th-place New Zealand defeating minor premiers Melbourne saw the Raiders eliminated.

Season results

Toyota Cup (Under 20s)
The Raiders' Toyota Cup team won 28–24 over the Broncos' team in golden point extra time to with the Toyota Cup (Under 20s) premiership in the lead-up game to the NRL Grand Final on 5 October 2008

Club Awards

Squad

Colin Best
Terry Campese
Marshall Chalk
 Neville Costigan
Phil Graham
Marc Herbert
Ryan Hinchcliffe
Ben Jones

 Brett Kelly
 Tom Learoyd-Lahrs
 Scott Logan
 Josh Miller
 David Milne
 Joel Monaghan
 Joe Picker
 Adrian Purtell

 Nigel Plum
 Troy Thompson
 Trevor Thurling
 Dane Tilse
 Alan Tongue (c)
 Glen Turner
 Michael Weyman
 Lincoln Withers

Players used outside top 25
Glen Buttriss
Justin Carney
Joel Thompson
Released mid-season
Todd Carney
Michael Dobson

Run-on Team

Ladders

References

Canberra Raiders seasons
Canberra Raiders season